Prodromos "Makis" Dreliozis (Greek: Πρόδρομος "Μάκις" Δρελιώζης; born March 31, 1975 in Athens, Greece), is a retired Greek professional basketball player. At 2.01 m (6 ft. 7 in.) in height and 91 kg. (200 lbs.) in weight, he played at the shooting guard and small forward positions.

Professional career
Dreliozis made his pro debut in 1990, with Panionios, at the age of 15 years and 6 months. He was the youngest player to have played in the top-tier level Greek Basket League, from the time the league had formed into the A1 national category, in the 1986–87 season. Georgios Papagiannis holds the current mark for being the youngest player to play in the league, under its current format (since 1992–93).

Dreliozis was the first Greek basketball player to use the Bosman ruling, when he signed with the Italian League club Libertas Forlì, in 1996.

References

External links
Euroleague.net Profile
FIBA Europe Profile
Eurobasket.com Profile
Italian League Profile 
Δρελιώζης for the win 

1975 births
Living people
AGEH Gymnastikos B.C. players
Dafnis B.C. players
Fulgor Libertas Forlì players
Greek Basket League players
Greek men's basketball players
Panellinios B.C. players
Panionios B.C. players
Shooting guards
Small forwards
Basketball players from Athens